Vedic science may refer to:

Vedic period
 Ayurveda
 Vedanga, the six ancient disciplines (shastra) subservient to the understanding and tradition of the Vedas
 Shiksha: phonetics and phonology (sandhi)
 Chandas: meter
 Vyakarana: grammar
 Nirukta: etymology
 Jyotisha: astrology (Hindu astronomy)
 Kalpa: ritual

Traditional
 Historical Indian mathematics
 Traditional Hindu units of measurement
 Ayurveda, traditional medicine of India

See also

 Hindu cosmology
 Hindu views on evolution
 Science and technology in ancient India
 Shastra

Indian philosophy
Vedas
Vedangas
Ayurveda
Hindu philosophical concepts